The Winged Tiger is a 1970 Hong Kong wuxia film produced by the Shaw Brothers Studio, starring actor Chan Hung-lit, who was well known for playing villain roles, in his first lead role as a protagonist. The film also co-stars Angela Yu Chien, Tien Feng and David Chiang. Lau Kar-leung served as action director for the film.

Plot
The late King of the Martial World has written a coveted manual which details his skills which can turn the practitioner into a supreme fighter. Knowing his two disciples would be deadly rivals, he separated the manual into two parts: one with odd-numbered pages and the other with even number pages. The Yin family possesses the odd-numbered page manual while the Winged Tiger, Teng Fei (Cheng Lui), has the even-number paged manual. Master Yin (Tien Feng), the King of Hades, wants the entire manual and arranges his younger sister, Yin Cai-fa (Angela Yu Chien), to marry the Winged Tiger in order to obtain the other manual. The chief of Mount Hua (Cheng Lui) and the leaders of Eight Schools sends famed martial artist, Flying Hero Guo Jiou-ru (Chan Hung-lit), who is proficient in ventriloquism and possesses comparable skills to Teng, to impersonate him and infiltrate the Yin household to steal away the other manual in order to prevent Yin from boosting his skills for evil doings.

Guo arrives at the Peaceful Tavern and orders a room next to Teng where he eavesdrop on Teng's conversation with his assistant, the Soul-Sucking Lad (Wong Kin-wah), on his plan to pretend to fall for Cai-fa and requests Yin for the marriage with Cai-fa before he can learn the manual, as Teng is also after Yin's half of the manual. The next day, while on his way to the Yin Forest, Teng is attacked by martial artists who are after his manual, but he manages to kill all of them. Guo, who is disguised as Teng, is also attacked by a group of martial artists who are after Teng's manual. Teng happens to pass by during this time and joins Guo in the fight where they kill all of the martial artists. Afterwards, Teng asks Guo of his identity and the Soul-Sucking Lad and informs Teng of Guo's identity and his mission. Guo fights with Teng and the Soul-Sucking Lad and kills both of them and obtains Teng's manual. Master Liu Yi-ying (Fang Mian) and her daughter, Yan-qing (Annette Sam) arrives to bring a letter from the Right Schools to Guo suggesting him to destroy the manual to minimize his danger once he reaches the Yin Forest. Guo refuses to do so since he wants to obtain the full manual to spread its teachings to the martial world and rips off a couple pages of the manual and gives it to Yan-qing in cases he dies in his mission, Yin would not be able to obtain the complete manual. In return, Yan-qing gives Guo a mini sword which once impaled, the wound can only be treated by Master Liu.

Guo arrives at the Yin Forest where he meets Yin, You Ming (Paul Wei) and the Three Officers, Jade Face Bai Yun-sheng (David Chiang), Iron Hand Zhao Bi (Luo Han) and  Golden Face Liu Kun (Tong Tin-hei). Guo presents Yin with his part of the manual before speaking privately to You Ming, who is colluding with Teng to obtain Yin's part of the manual, although You Ming suspects Guo of his identity. At this time, the Three Officers also schemes to have Guo killed to take his manual and obtain Yin's manual as well.

Cai-fa, who is unhappy about her marriage with Teng, instantly changes her mind after she sees Guo in person and is smitten with him. Guo then stealths around the Yin mansion and kills several guards while Yan-qing also sneaks in to the Yin Forest to give a message to Guo. In the meantime, Teng's body was also discovered by Yin's lieutenant, Zhang Piao (Yeung Chsk-lam) and was brought into the Yin Forest where You Ming suspects Guo may be impersonating Teng. Since Teng flies with his wings while Guo jumps with the power of his feet stepping on each other, You Ming suggests Yin to test Guo's martial arts to see whether he knows Teng's signature killing technique. Guo then fights and kills a couple of Yin's henchman with Teng's signature killing technique and wins Yin's trust while also handing his part of the manual to Yin. You Ming, however, is still suspicious of Guo's identity and suggests Yin to lure Guo to the steal the manual by telling Cai-fa to inform Guo where the manual is hidden.

Guo secretly follows Yin, Cai-fa and You Ming when they hide the manual inside a tripod inside a cave. When Cai-fa returns to the mansion, Guo fakes s conversation with a shadow mannequin of You Ming where he pretends to tell You Ming that he is no longer interested in the manual since he was fallen in love with Cai-fa and wants to marry her. Guo and Cai-fa make love and Cai-fa reveals Yin and You Ming's plan to him about testing his sincerity. At this time, Yan-qing had also snuck into the Yin mansion and unhappy of Guo and Cai-fa's relationship, Guo explains to her about pretending to be in love with Cai-fa, who overhead their conversation. Cai-fa informs her brother of Guo's identity and ambushes Guo. After an extended fight with Yin's guards, Guo was heavily injured and flies away where he then hides in Cai-fa's room. Despite his betrayal, Cai-fa is still very much in love with Guo and nurse him back to health and Guo reveals to her his true intention of obtaining the full manual and spread its teachings to the martial world and that they can be together after he succeeds but she is not completely convinced.

Cai-fa ties Guo up but he escapes by burning the rope with a candle when Cai-fa fell asleep and goes to the cave to steal the manual. However, the tripod turns out empty and Yin traps Guo inside the cave. Cai-fa then arrives to attack Guo with enticing bombs which are really duds as she actually helps him escape and fend off Yin's thugs, but Guo accidentally impales her with the sword given to him by Yan-qing. Cai-fa tells Guo she does not hate him for using her and would rather him pretend to love her until the very end while Guo also deduces he has fallen into You Ming's trap of using him to steal the manual. You Ming also arrives at this time and Guo fights and kills him before fighting and killing the Three Officers. Guo then attempts to flee with Cai-fa was stopped by Zhang and more guards and kills them before Yin arrives and fights with Guo where Yin gains the upper hand when he wraps his whip around Guo's neck. In order to save him, Cai-fa asks Guo to give Yin the manual and it is revealed Yin never hid the manual in the cave and wanted to pages that Guo ripped off from the odd-numbered manual. Cai-fa then pulls out the sword impaled in her and cuts off Yin's whip and Guo kills Yin. Cai-fa dies from her would and Guo carries her dead body to Mount Hua.

Cast
Chan Hung-lit as Flying Hero Guo Jiou-ru
Tien Feng as Master Yin, King of Hades
Angela Yu Chien as Yin Cai-fa
Annette Sam as Liu Yan-qing
Fang Mian as Master Liu Yi-ying
Paul Wei as You Ming
David Chiang as Jade Face Bai Yun-sheng
Law Hon as Iron Hand Zhao Bi
Tong Hin-hei as Golden Face Liu Kun
Cheng Lui as Winged Tiger Teng Fei
Wong Kin-wah as Soul Sucking Lad
Cheng Miu as Chief of Mount Hua
Yip Bo-kam as Xin Lu
Yeung Chak-lam as Zhang Piao
Wong Chung as martial artist after Winged Tiger's manual
Wong Ching as martial artist after Winged Tiger's manual
Yuen Woo-ping as martial artist after Winged Tiger's manual
Lau Kar-wing as martial artist after Winged Tiger's manual
Ho Bo-sing as martial artist after Winged Tiger's manual
Yeung Chan-sing as martial artist after Winged Tiger's manual
Lee Siu-wa as martial artist after Winged Tiger's manual
Hsu Hsia as martial artist after Winged Tiger's manual
Tam Bo as martial artist after Winged Tiger's manual
Yen Shi-kwan as martial artist after Winged Tiger's manual
Yuen Shun-yi as martial artist after Winged Tiger's manual
Ng Yuen-fan as martial artist after Winged Tiger's manual
Wong Shu-tong as martial artist after Winged Tiger's manual
Tung Choi-bo as Master Yin's thug
Chan Chuen as Master Yin's thug
Chui Chung-hok as Master Yin's thug
Yuen Shing-chau as Master Yin's thug
Fei Ying as Master Yin's thug
Chan Siu-kai as Master Yin's thug
Lei Lung as Master Yin's thug
Lo Wai as Master Yin's thug
Hao Li-jen as chief of one of the Eight Schools

Box office
The film grossed HK$552,565.60 at the Hong Kong box office during its theatrical run from 18 to 27 February 1970 in Hong Kong.

External links
 
 The Winged Tiger at the Hong Kong Movie DataBase
 Winged Tiger at Hong Kong Cinemagic

1970 films
1970 action films
1970 martial arts films
Hong Kong action films
Hong Kong martial arts films
Kung fu films
Wuxia films
1970s Mandarin-language films
Shaw Brothers Studio films
Films set in 11th-century Song dynasty
1970s Hong Kong films